"Episode 29", also known as "Beyond Life and Death", is the twenty-second and final episode of the second season of the American mystery television series Twin Peaks. Episode 29 served as the final episode of Twin Peaks for over 25 years, until Twin Peaks: The Return was aired in 2017. Upon its original airing in 1991, the episode was paired with episode 28 to form the second hour of what was then billed as a two-part series finale. The episode was written by the series co-creator Mark Frost, producer Harley Peyton and regular writer Robert Engels and was directed by series co-creator David Lynch, who rewrote parts of the script. It features series regulars Kyle MacLachlan, Michael Ontkean, Richard Beymer and Kenneth Welsh; and guest stars Frank Silva as Killer Bob, Michael J. Anderson as The Man from Another Place, Carel Struycken as The Giant, and Heather Graham as Annie Blackburn.

Twin Peaks centers on the investigation into the murder of schoolgirl Laura Palmer (Sheryl Lee) in the small rural town in Washington state after which the series is named. In this episode, after the kidnap of Annie Blackburn, Federal Bureau of Investigation (FBI) Special Agent Dale Cooper (MacLachlan) and Sheriff Truman (Ontkean) pursue Windom Earle (Welsh) to a portal leading to The Black Lodge—a strange, frightening place which exists on an alternate plane of reality. Cooper enters, whereupon his courage is tested by The Man from Another Place, Earle, a number of doppelgängers, and Killer Bob.

"Episode 29" was broadcast on June 10, 1991 on the American Broadcasting Company (ABC) and was watched by an audience of 10.4 million households in the United States, about 12 percent of the available audience. The episode was well received and has been the subject of vast critical and academic commentary. Several of the episode's cliffhangers were expanded upon in the 2016 tie-in book The Secret History of Twin Peaks, and also touched upon less directly in Lynch's 1992 movie Twin Peaks: Fire Walk With Me, in Twin Peaks: The Missing Pieces, and Twin Peaks: The Return.

Plot

Background 
The small town of Twin Peaks, Washington, has been shocked by the murder of schoolgirl Laura Palmer (Sheryl Lee) and the attempted murder of her friend Ronette Pulaski (Phoebe Augustine). Federal Bureau of Investigation (FBI) Special Agent Dale Cooper (Kyle MacLachlan) has been sent to the town to investigate, and has discovered the murderer, a demonic spirit named Killer BOB (Frank Silva), had possessed the body of Laura's father, Leland Palmer (Ray Wise). Cooper's departure from Twin Peaks is halted by the arrival of his former FBI partner, Windom Earle (Kenneth Welsh), who engages Cooper in a dangerous chess match. Earle's true goal is to use the power of the supernatural Black Lodge, whose entrance is somewhere in the woods surrounding Twin Peaks.

Annie Blackburn (Heather Graham), a former convent resident and sister of Norma Jennings (Peggy Lipton), arrives in Twin Peaks. Cooper falls in love with her, and convinces her to join the Miss Twin Peaks pageant. Meanwhile, Earle begins his plan, knowing the whereabouts of the Black Lodge's entrance. Concluding he requires fear to enter, he interrupts the Miss Twin Peaks pageant and kidnaps its winner, Annie. In the pandemonium, Nadine Hurley (Wendy Robie), a 35-year old woman believing herself to be an eighteen-year-old high school senior, sustains a head injury. Meanwhile, Deputy Sheriff Andy Brennan (Harry Goaz) discovers a map hidden in a cave marking.

High school student Donna Hayward (Lara Flynn Boyle) attempts to find connections between her mother, Eileen Hayward (Mary Jo Deschanel) and local businessman Benjamin Horne (Richard Beymer). Donna has found details of an affair between them, and has now learned that Benjamin is her biological father.

Sawmill owner Catherine Martell (Piper Laurie) discovers a puzzle box left by her brother's business enemy, Thomas Eckhardt (David Warner). Catherine and her brother Andrew Packard (Dan O'Herlihy) find a security deposit key inside the box.

Events 
Sheriff Harry S. Truman (Michael Ontkean), Deputy Sheriff Hawk (Michael Horse), Andy, and Cooper stand in the sheriff's office, pondering on the disappearance of Earle and Annie. Local logger Pete Martell (Jack Nance) enters, telling the Sheriff that the Log Lady (Catherine E. Coulson) stole his car. Cooper concludes it was a disguised Earle escaping with Annie, and the real Log Lady enters, holding a jar of engine oil. Ronette Pulaski is brought in, and recognizes the oil's smell from the night of Laura's death. Meanwhile, Truman recalls a circle of twelve sycamore trees in the woods, which match up with the markings on the cave map.

Nadine recovers from her head injury with her senior boyfriend Mike Nelson (Gary Hershberger), estranged husband Ed Hurley (Everett McGill), doctor Doc Hayward (Warren Frost), and Norma. Nadine recovers her memory, and becomes horrified when she sees Ed and Norma together. She bursts into tears, abandoning Mike.

Windom arrives at the circle of sycamores, with Annie captive. A small pool of oil lies at the center of the trees; Annie becomes catatonic upon approaching it. A ghostly red curtain appears behind the pool. They pass through it and vanish. Cooper and Truman find Pete's car, and Cooper follows alone. Hearing an owl, Cooper finds the pool at the center of the sycamore trees, and sees red curtains appear. He goes through them, and the curtains disappear.

Now in the Black Lodge, Cooper passes through red-curtained hallways, finding himself in the Red Room. The Man from Another Place (Michael J. Anderson) dances into the room and sits in a velvet chair. A strobe light flickers as Jimmy Scott sings a jazz ballad. Outside the Black Lodge, Andy and Harry wait for Cooper.

At the Hayward house, Donna remains distraught. Ben and Donna's mother attempt to console her. Doctor Hayward arrives, enraged. He attacks Ben, knocking him unconscious. Meanwhile, Andrew steals the safe deposit box key. He is seen by Pete, who accompanies him to the bank.

Audrey Horne (Sherilyn Fenn) walks into the Twin Peaks bank and chains herself to the bank vault to protest a local housing development. Andrew and Pete arrive with the safe deposit key, and they open the box left by Thomas Eckhardt. The box is opened, revealing a bomb and a note from Eckhardt. The bomb explodes, blowing out the bank's windows.

At the Double R Diner, Bobby Briggs (Dana Ashbrook) proposes marriage to Shelly Johnson (Mädchen Amick). Nearby, Major Briggs receives a message from Sarah Palmer (Grace Zabriskie), Laura's mother, in a distorted and different voice: "I'm in the Black Lodge with Dale Cooper. I'm waiting for you."

In the Black Lodge, Cooper encounters mysterious figures. The Man from Another Place offers him coffee, and tells Cooper that "when you see me again, it won't be me." Cooper sees Laura Palmer, who tells him that she will see him again in 25 years. Laura holds a mysterious pose, then disappears. An elderly waiter from the Great Northern Hotel (Hank Worden) gives Cooper a coffee that changes consistency. The waiter is replaced by The Giant (Carel Struycken), who sits down and says, "One and the same." The Man from Another Place says, "Fire, walk with me." Cooper sees an explosion of flames, and the waiting room turns dark. He leaves the room, and passes through several more rooms. In one, he finds Maddy Ferguson (Lee), who says "Watch out for my cousin."

Cooper finds the Man from Another Place twitching and grimacing, saying "doppelgänger". A doppelgänger of Laura appears, holding the same pose as before. She shrieks and charges Cooper. Cooper briefly sees the face of Windom Earle over Laura's and flees. In a different room, Cooper finds a fresh stab wound in his stomach. He stumbles back to a new room, following a trail of his own blood, and sees Caroline, Earle's wife, lying on the floor beside his own bloodied body. He calls for her, and the woman turns into Annie. Annie sits up, covered in blood. Cooper calls out to her, but the room turns dark, and the bodies disappear.

Cooper walks into a room with a black marble table. Annie appears and tells Cooper that the man who killed her was her husband. Cooper is baffled. Annie turns into Caroline, and she turns into a doppelgänger of Laura. She shrieks and turns into Windom Earle. Windom tells Cooper he will let Annie live if Cooper gives him his soul. Cooper agrees without hesitation, and Windom stabs Cooper. The stabbing suddenly reverses, and Killer BOB appears, holding Earle like a puppet. BOB extracts Earle's soul, and Cooper leaves.  A doppelgänger of Cooper enters the room and laughs with BOB.

A doppelgänger of Leland Palmer appears in the hall and says to Cooper, "I did not kill anybody." Meanwhile, doppelgänger Cooper comes into the hall and snickers with Leland, then chases Cooper. Cooper flees but is caught by his doppelgänger just before he can escape.

It is nightfall again. The gateway to the Black Lodge glows for a moment and disappears. Harry finds Cooper and Annie lying in the circle of trees.

Cooper wakes the next morning at the Great Northern, with Harry and Doc Hayward watching over him. Cooper asks, "How's Annie?" Harry replies that Annie will recover. Cooper gets up out of bed, announcing he needs to brush his teeth. In the bathroom, Cooper lunges his head towards the mirror, with BOB looking back, revealing it was Cooper's doppelgänger that arrived from the Black Lodge. As Truman and Hayward begin to worry, Cooper's doppelgänger menacingly smiles and mockingly repeats, "How's Annie?"

Production
The officially credited writers for this episode are Mark Frost, Harley Peyton, and Robert Engels. However, David Lynch revised their script significantly sans credit; he maintained the episode's general structure but altered much of the dialogue and many scenes, most notably in the Red Room/Black Lodge sequences, making them more akin to the dream sequences in the first season. Lynch also expanded the cast, adding characters that were not in the original script like The Log Lady and some that hadn't been seen in the series for some time, including Maddy Ferguson, the Palmer family, Ronette Pulaski, and Heidi the waitress, meaning Ray Wise, Grace Zabriskie, Sheryl Lee, Phoebe Augustine, Andrea Hays and more return.

James Marshall, Joan Chen, and Piper Laurie do not appear in this episode.

In an interview with Chris Rodley, Lynch said that the last episode "was written, but when it came to the Red Room, it was, in my opinion, completely and totally wrong. Completely and totally wrong. And so I changed that part. A lot of the other parts were things that had been started and were on a certain route, so they had to continue. But you can still direct them in a certain way. But I really like that last episode."

The major differences between the episode as originally scripted and as actually filmed are as follows:

 The Log Lady and Ronette Pulaski, both of whom appear in the actual episode, do not appear in the original script.
 The confrontation between Benjamin Horne and the Haywards is generally the same, although there is more dialogue in the original script. Also, in the original script, Doc Hayward shoves Ben, who strikes his head against a coffee table; a distraught Doc Hayward rushes to Ben's aid and apologises to him. In the filmed episode, Doc Hayward punches Ben, who splits his head against the fireplace; Doc Hayward reacts with terror and does not rush to Ben's aid.
 In the original script, Hawk and Major Briggs find Leo Johnson in Windom Earle's cabin. Leo instinctively begins to speak when he sees them, setting off the spider-trap set by Earle. Lynch replaced this with the scene in the Double R Diner featuring Bobby, Shelly, Major Briggs, Mrs Briggs, Dr Jacoby, Sarah Palmer, and Heidi the German waitress. With the exception of Major Briggs, none of these characters appear in the original script. In the filmed episode, Leo is only seen very briefly, via footage from the previous episode; his ultimate fate is left unresolved.
 In the original script, Pete Martell does not accompany Andrew Packard into the bank. Instead, Catherine Martell rushes into the bank just before Andrew accidentally sets off the bomb. Catherine does not appear at all in the filmed episode, and in the original script, Pete's only appearance is in the Sheriff's station at the beginning of the episode.
 In the original script, Sheriff Truman sees a vision of a dark woman wearing chain mail, holding a sword and a shield.
 The sequences in the Black Lodge are almost totally different in the original script: a ghostly version of The Great Northern appears; Windom Earle has much more dialogue; there is no backwards-talking; Laura Palmer appears only for an instant and does not speak; The Black Lodge Singer, The Man from Another Place, the Giant, the Elderly Bellhop, Maddy Ferguson, and Leland Palmer do not appear. Windom Earle's fate is less abrupt - he ends up shackled to a dentist's chair with Bob as the torturer.
 The revelation at episode's end that Cooper's doppelgänger is now inhabited by Bob is more subtle in the original script. In the bathroom scene, Cooper squeezes toothpaste onto his toothbrush, looks to the mirror and smiles, with Bob's reflection smiling back; the episode ends at this point. In the filmed episode, Cooper squeezes the toothpaste into the sink, sees Bob's reflection in the mirror, smashes his head into the mirror, says "How’s Annie?" repeatedly, and laughs uncontrollably.

The Secret History of Twin Peaks

The 2016 tie-in book for the 2017 relaunch of the series elaborates on some of the events that transpire in "Beyond Life and Death." The book takes the form of a dossier that has been compiled by an initially unidentified former resident of Twin Peaks. It is revealed in The Secret History of Twin Peaks that Audrey Horne survived the bomb blast at the bank, but that both Pete Martell and Andrew Packard died. We also learn that Benjamin Horne survived his run in with Doc Hayward and later purchased all of Catherine Martell's land in Twin Peaks retaining his stranglehold on the town. Catherine later became a recluse.

Agent Cooper's fate is elaborated on slightly when it is revealed that the dossier was compiled by Major Garland Briggs, who, after the immediate events of the finale, discovered that Cooper was the "key" to unlocking the mystery of Project Blue Book and the Black Lodge. Upon hearing that Cooper was resting at the Great Northern following his experience in the Lodge, Briggs requested that Cooper join him at his house to discuss his experiences. Later that evening Cooper joined Briggs at the family house, but what happened at the house is not specified. Major Briggs's final entry in the dossier states that Cooper left the house later that evening and that Briggs realized that something was wrong with him; he then writes that he realized what he had to do and signed off with the message "M*A*Y*D*A*Y". It is here that the dossier ends.

Notes

References

Sources

External links

1991 American television episodes
Twin Peaks (season 2) episodes
Television episodes written by Mark Frost